Litchfield may refer to:

Places

Antarctica
 Litchfield Island, Palmer Archipelago

Australia
 Litchfield Municipality, Northern Territory
 Litchfield National Park, Northern Territory
 Litchfield Station, Northern Territory

Canada
 Litchfield, Nova Scotia
 Litchfield, Quebec

United Kingdom
 Litchfield, Hampshire, England
 Litchfield Street, Westminster, London

United States
 Litchfield, California
 Litchfield, Connecticut
 Litchfield (borough), Connecticut
 Litchfield County, Connecticut
 Litchfield Hills, Connecticut
 Litchfield, Illinois
 Litchfield, Kansas
 Litchfield, Maine
 Litchfield, Michigan
 Litchfield, Minnesota
 Litchfield, Nebraska
 Litchfield, New Hampshire 
 Litchfield, New York
 Litchfield, Ohio
 Litchfield Beach, South Carolina
 Litchfield Plantation, South Carolina
 Litchfield Township (disambiguation)

Education 
 Litchfield Female Academy, in Litchfield, Connecticut; defunct
 Litchfield High School (disambiguation)
 Litchfield Law School, in Litchfield, Connecticut
 Litchfield Towers, a student residence at the University of Pittsburgh

Other uses 
 Litchfield (surname)
 The Litchfield Company, an American real estate development company
 Litchfield Federal Penitentiary, a fictional prison in the television series Orange Is the New Black
 Litchfield Municipal Airport (disambiguation)
 Litchfield Observatory, Hamilton College, New York
 Litchfield Villa, Brooklyn, New York

See also 

 Litchfield Park (disambiguation)
 Lichfield (disambiguation)
 
 Litch (disambiguation)
 Lich (disambiguation)